Clay Township is one of twelve townships in Bartholomew County, Indiana, United States. As of the 2010 census, its population was 3,271 and it contained 1,320 housing units.

Geography

Cities, towns, villages
 Columbus (east edge)

Unincorporated towns
 Jewell Village
 Petersville
(This list is based on USGS data and may include former settlements.)

Adjacent townships
 Haw Creek Township (northeast)
 Clifty Township (east)
 Rock Creek Township (southeast)
 Columbus Township (west)
 Flat Rock Township (northwest)

Cemeteries
The township contains these two cemeteries: Sand Hill and Sharon.

Major highways
  U.S. Route 31
  State Road 9
  State Road 46

Landmarks
 Otter Creek County Golf Course

School districts
 Bartholomew Consolidated School Corporation

Political districts
 Indiana's 6th congressional district
 State House District 57
 State Senate District 41

References

Citations

Sources
 United States Census Bureau 2007 TIGER/Line Shapefiles
 United States Board on Geographic Names (GNIS)
 United States National Atlas

External links

 Indiana Township Association
 United Township Association of Indiana

Townships in Bartholomew County, Indiana
Townships in Indiana